Tony Hendrik (born Dieter Lünstedt, 4 March 1945 in Bad Bederkesa, a.k.a. Dee Dee Halligan, Jimmy Tarsus) is a German music producer, composer, and owner of a record label. The most known artists and bands he has produced and composed for are Bad Boys Blue, Londonbeat, and Haddaway. Hendrik co-wrote the Haddaway song "What Is Love."

Early years and first bands
Tony Hendrik was born in Bad Bederkesa in 1945. He graduated from a high school in Rendsburg and initially founded a beat band named "Hendrik & The Luniks" that performed at Hamburg's Star-Club. In 1966, he left his hometown to study in Cologne. There he started a new band "The Tony Hendrik Five". By 1970, Tony won his first success with the group—single "The Grooviest Girl in the World" became his first bestseller.

He subsequently worked for the German branch of the record label Vogue where he began producing.

References

External links
Official website
Coconut Records

1945 births
Living people
German composers
German songwriters
German male musicians